The 11th Independent Spirit Awards, honoring the best in independent filmmaking for 1995, were announced on March 23, 1996.  It was hosted by Samuel L. Jackson.

Nominees and winners

{| class="wikitable"
!Best Feature
!Best Director
|-
|Leaving Las Vegas

The Addiction
Living in Oblivion
Safe
The Secret of Roan Inish
|Mike Figgis – Leaving Las Vegas

Michael Almereyda – Nadja
Ulu Grosbard – Georgia
Todd Haynes – Safe
John Sayles – The Secret of Roan Inish
|-
!Best Male Lead
!Best Female Lead
|-
|Sean Penn – Dead Man Walking

Nicolas Cage – Leaving Las Vegas
Tim Roth – Little Odessa
Jimmy Smits – My Family
Kevin Spacey – Swimming with Sharks
|Elisabeth Shue – Leaving Las Vegas

Jennifer Jason Leigh – Georgia
Elina Löwensohn – Nadja
Julianne Moore – Safe
Lili Taylor – The Addiction
|-
!Best Supporting Male
!Best Supporting Female
|-
|Benicio del Toro – The Usual Suspects

James LeGros – Living in Oblivion
David Morse – The Crossing Guard
Max Perlich – Georgia
Harold Perrineau – Smoke
|Mare Winningham – Georgia

Jennifer Lopez – My Family
Vanessa Redgrave – Little Odessa
Chloë Sevigny – Kids
Celia Weston – Dead Man Walking
|-
!Best Screenplay
!Best First Screenplay
|-
|The Usual Suspects – Christopher McQuarrieLeaving Las Vegas – Mike Figgis
Living in Oblivion – Tom DiCillo
Safe – Todd Haynes
The Secret of Roan Inish – John Sayles
|Smoke – Paul AusterKids – Harmony Korine
Little Odessa – James Gray
Post Cards from America – Steve McLean
River of Grass – Kelly Reichardt
|-
!Best First Feature
!Best Debut Performance
|-
|The Brothers McMullen

Kids
Little Odessa
Picture Bride
River of Grass
|Justin Pierce – Kids

Jason Andrews – Rhythm Thief
Lisa Bowman – River of Grass
Gabriel Casseus – New Jersey Drive
Rose McGowan – The Doom Generation
|-
!Best Cinematography
!Best Foreign Film
|-
|Leaving Las Vegas – Declan QuinnLittle Odessa – Tom Richmond
Nadja – Jim Denault
The Underneath – Elliot Davis
The Usual Suspects – Newton Thomas Sigel
|Before the Rain • MacedoniaThe City of Lost Children • France
Exotica • Canada
I Am Cuba • Soviet Union
Through the Olive Trees • Iran
|}

 Films that received multiple nominations 

 Films that won multiple awards 

Special awards

Someone to Watch AwardChristopher Münch – Color of a Brisk and Leaping Day
Tim McCann – Desolation Angels
Jennifer Montgomery – Art for Teachers of Children
Kelly Reichardt – River of Grass
Rafal Zielinski – Fun

Special Distinction Award
Samuel Fuller

References

External links 
1995 Spirit Awards at IMDb
Full show on Film Independent's YouTube channel

1995
Independent Spirit Awards